Paride Taban (born 1936 in Opari, Eastern Equatoria) is a South Sudanese Emeritus Bishop of the Roman Catholic Church and was the first leader of the New Sudan Council of Churches, which was founded in February 1990. he was auxiliary Bishop of Juba 28 Jan 1980 to 2 July 1983 and served as bishop of Torit from 1983 to 2004.

Biography
Taban was the first bishop of the Roman Catholic Diocese of Torit in what was then Sudan from 1983 until 2004. In 1989, when the rebel Sudan People's Liberation Army (SPLA) overtook Torit, he was arrested with three other Catholic priests by the SPLA. Until 1990 he and Nathanael Garang were the only two Bishops active in areas held by the SPLA. Since his retirement from the diocese, he has been leading an effort to make peace in South Sudan real by setting up the Kuron Peace Village, established in 2005. Before becoming bishop of Torit, Taban was auxiliary bishop of the Archdiocese of Juba and the titular bishop of Tadamata from 1980 to 1983.  He was ordained May 24, 1964 and consecrated a Bishop May 4, 1980 in Kinshasa by Pope John Paul II.

Taban was sent to Rwanda in the aftermath of the 1994 genocide for reconciliation efforts.

Bishop Paride has received numerous awards including the Sergio Vieira de Mello Peace Prize awarded by UN Secretary General Ban Ki-moon in 2013 for his work at the Holy Trinity Peace Village in Kuron  and the Hubert Walter Award for Reconciliation and Interfaith Cooperation awarded by the Archbishop of Canterbury Justin Welby in 2017 for co-founding the ecumenical New Sudan Council of Churches, building Kuron Peace Village, and chairing the mediation initiative between the Government of South Sudan and COBRA Faction of the South Sudan Democratic Movement/Army  led by David Yau Yau, which produced a successful peace agreement on 6 January 2014.

In December 2016, Taban was appointed by the President Salva Kiir Mayardit as a co-chair of the steering committee of National Dialogue. Taban has witnessed the suffering of South Sudanese since he was young and he was not happy to see south South Sudanese suffering in the hands of their fellow southerners

AWARDS
In September 2017, Taban received the peace award of the United Religious Initiatives for Africa.

In May 2018 Taban received the Four Freedoms Award, freedom of Worship medal from the Roosevelt Foundation for his life-long and selfless dedication to the cause of bringing freedom and peace to the people of South Sudan https://www.fourfreedoms.nl/en/laureaten/year:2018/award:freedom-of-worship-award/laureates:paride-taban.htm

References

External links
 Kuron Peace Village page

1936 births
Living people
20th-century Roman Catholic bishops in South Sudan
20th-century Roman Catholic bishops in Sudan
People from Eastern Equatoria
Nonviolence advocates
21st-century Roman Catholic bishops in South Sudan
South Sudanese Roman Catholic bishops
Roman Catholic bishops of Juba
Roman Catholic bishops of Torit